"Bootie Call" is a song performed by English-Canadian girl group All Saints from their debut album, All Saints (1998). The song was co-written by group member Shaznay Lewis in collaboration with its producer, Karl Gordon. "Bootie Call" was first released on 31 August 1998 by London Records as All Saints' fourth official single.

"Bootie Call" was released on cassette, CD and 12-inch format accompanied by a B-side entitled "Get Down" as well as previous hit "I Know Where It's At" and a remix of "Never Ever". It achieved chart success, topping the UK Singles Chart on 6 September 1998 and becoming the group's third consecutive number-one hit. The single also performed well internationally, peaking within the top 10 in Iceland, Ireland, and the Netherlands and the top 40 in Belgium and Sweden.

Music video
A music video was produced to promote the single. It featured All Saints sitting and lying down in an open top car while singing the song. There was also clips of a group of people walking down the street wearing matching outfits, various people being silly with the phone, break dancing in the street and a woman playing golf on top of the phone box.

Track listings

Charts and certifications

Weekly charts

Year-end charts

Certifications

|}

References

1997 songs
1998 singles
All Saints (group) songs
Songs about casual sex
Songs written by K-Gee
Songs written by Shaznay Lewis
UK Singles Chart number-one singles